Love After Love can refer to:

 Love After Love (1992 film), a French film
 Love After Love (2017 film), an American film
 Love After Love (2020 film), a Chinese film

 Love After Love (poem), a poem by Derek Walcott